Shen Hongfei (born 1962 in Shanghai), is a writer, producer and food columnist in China.

Shen has become quite famous for his inspired yet unexpected comments about food that appeared on various newspapers and magazines columns, and TV shows in China.

Life 
He studied journalism in Jinan University in late 1970s and graduated in 1984.

Column 
Shen has been a food critic and columnist for Southern Weekly (simplified Chinese: 南方周末) in 2002. He also wrote a column "Ideological Work" for one of the most prominent magazines in China, Sanlian Life Magazine.

References

1962 births
Living people
Chinese food writers
Writers from Shanghai
Chinese restaurant critics
Chinese columnists
Jinan University alumni